Kew is primarily known as the London district which contains Kew Gardens, but it can also be a surname and a given name. People with this name include:

Surname
Alex Kew (born 1986), English actor, musician, and singer-songwriter
Gordon Kew (1930–2018), English football referee 
Harry Wallis Kew (1868–1948), English amateur zoologist
Henry Ah Kew (1900–1966), New Zealand lawyer and community leader
Kew Siang Tong (born ?), Malaysian gastroenterologist, academic administrator, and health bureaucrat

Given name
Kew Jaliens (born 1978), Dutch footballer
Kew Nordqvist (born 1950), Swedish politician
Kim Seung-kew (born 1944), South Korean politician, lawyer, and jurist
Lai Kew Chai (1941–2006), Malaysia-born Singaporean supreme court judge
Tan Yee Kew (born 1953), Malaysian politician
Teh Kew San (born 1934), Malaysian badminton player
Wat Ngong (also known as Kew-a-gong, Kew-Agang, or Kew A-gang; 1785–1867), Chinese Protestant convert, evangelist, writer, and lithographer
Wong Kew-Lit (born 1971), Malaysian film director and producer

See also
Kew (disambiguation)
McKew (disambiguation), a similar surname
St Kew, a Cornish village and namesake of Cywa (Kew), a Welsh saint and the founder of a monastery in the area of St Kew